John Roderick Mansfield (born 29 May 1934) is a British engineer and business executive, influencing British motorsport, and ultimately many British boy racers.

Early life
He belonged to the 750 Motor Club.

Career

Ford
He created the Special Vehicle Engineering (SVE) department at the Dunton Technical Centre in Essex in 1980, and ran it until 1990. It produced the more-powerful roadworthy versions of the Ford Sierra.

Lotus
He became Managing Director of Lotus Cars on 14 August 1995, when Lotus was owned by Bugatti, who had bought the company from General Motors in 1993. He left Lotus in February 1996. Group Lotus employed around 900 people at its Norfolk factory.

Personal life
He lives in Little Burstead in Essex. He married Valerie Jones in 1958 in Surrey.

References

External links
 Motorsport Magazine

1934 births
Aston Martin
British automotive engineers
British motorsport people
Chief executives in the automobile industry
Ford of Europe
Ford people
Ford Team RS
Lotus Cars
Living people